Conchubhar Ua Flaithbertaigh, King of Iar Connacht, died 1186.

Biography

The Annals of Ulster, sub anno 1186, record that "Conchubhar Ua Flaithbertaigh was killed by Ruaidhri Ua Flaithbertaigh, by his own brother, in Ara."

See also

 Ó Flaithbertaigh

References
 
 West or H-Iar Connaught Ruaidhrí Ó Flaithbheartaigh, 1684 (published 1846, ed. James Hardiman).
 
 Origin of the Surname O'Flaherty, Anthony Matthews, Dublin, 1968, p. 40.

People from County Galway
1186 deaths
Conchubhar
12th-century Irish monarchs
Year of birth unknown